Abdulkader Dakka (born 10 January 1985 in Latakia, Syria) is a Syrian footballer. He currently plays for Al-Wahda, which competes in the Syrian Premier League the top division in Syria. He plays as a defender, wearing the number 30 jersey for Al-Wahda and for the Syrian national football team he wears the number 17 shirt.

Career

Club career 
Dakka started his professional career with Tishreen. On 8 March 2008, he transferred to Lebanese Premier League club Al-Ansar. Dakka left the Lebanese club after four months. In July 2008, he moved to the Syrian League club Al-Ittihad and helped the club reach the final of the AFC Cup the second most important association cup in Asia. Al-Ittihad won the final against Kuwaiti Premier League champions Al-Qadsia after penalties. The game was tied 1–1 after regular time and Extra Time.
In February 2011, he transferred to Chinese Super League club Shanghai Shenhua on a ten-month deal. but after five months the contract has been dissolved. Dakka returned to Al-Ittihad and won the 2010–11 Syrian Cup with his team.

International career 
Dakka was a part of the Syrian U-19 national team that finished in Fourth place at the 2004 AFC U-19 Championship in Malaysia and he was a part of the Syrian U-20 national team at the 2005 FIFA U-20 World Cup in the Netherlands. He plays against Canada, Italy and Colombia in the group-stage of the FIFA U-20 World Cup and against Brazil in the Round of 16. He was selected to Valeriu Tiţa's 23-man final squad for the 2011 AFC Asian Cup in Qatar and played full 90 minutes in all Syria's three group games against Saudi Arabia, Japan and Jordan.

Honour and Titles

Club 
Al-Ittihad
 Syrian Cup: 2011
 AFC Cup: 2010

National Team 
 AFC U-19 Championship 2004: Fourth place
 FIFA U-20 World Cup 2005: Round of 16
 West Asian Games 2005: Runner-up

References

External links 
 

1985 births
Living people
People from Latakia
Syrian footballers
Association football defenders
Syria international footballers
Syrian expatriate footballers
Expatriate footballers in Lebanon
Syrian expatriate sportspeople in Lebanon
Expatriate footballers in China
Syrian expatriate sportspeople in China
Expatriate footballers in Iraq
Syrian expatriate sportspeople in Iraq
Tishreen SC players
Al Ansar FC players
Al-Ittihad Aleppo players
Shanghai Shenhua F.C. players
2011 AFC Asian Cup players
Chinese Super League players
Footballers at the 2006 Asian Games
Asian Games competitors for Syria
AFC Cup winning players
Lebanese Premier League players
Syrian Premier League players